Pong Hai is a tambon (subdistrict) of Seka District, in Bueng Kan Province, Thailand. In 2020 it had a total population of 10,497 people.

History
The subdistrict was created effective May 15, 1973 by splitting off 7 administrative villages from Tha Kok Daeng.

Administration

Central administration
The tambon is subdivided into 18 administrative villages (muban).

Local administration
The whole area of the subdistrict is covered by the subdistrict municipality (Thesaban Tambon) Pong Hai (เทศบาลตำบลป่งไฮ).

References

External links
Thaitambon.com on Pong Hai

Tambon of Bueng Kan province
Populated places in Bueng Kan province
Seka District